Corcilius (also Corzilius, Corzillius and variants) is a German surname recorded from the 18th century in the German Rhineland, more specifically in the county of Wied-Neuwied.

The name survives in Germany today, mostly concentrated in the Rhineland, with (as of 2013) 103 phone-book entries for Corzilius, 50 for Corcilius and 33 for Corzillius.

Corcilius is also attested as a Roman-era gens.

References

German-language surnames